Alexander Wallace Matheson (June 11, 1903 – March 3, 1976) was a Prince Edward Island politician.

He was born in Bellevue, Prince Edward Island. He was first elected to the provincial legislature in 1940 as a Liberal, representing the district of 2nd Queens. Not reelected in the provincial election of 1943, he was reelected in 1947 in the district of 4th Kings.

Matheson became minister of health and welfare in the government of Premier J. Walter Jones in 1948 and succeeded Jones as premier and attorney-general in 1953. His government was defeated in the 1959 election but remained Liberal Party leader until 1965 when he retired from politics. In 1967 he was appointed a County Court Judge.

References

External links
 Alexander Wallace Matheson at The Canadian Encyclopedia

1903 births
1976 deaths
People from Queens County, Prince Edward Island
Members of the United Church of Canada
Premiers of Prince Edward Island
Prince Edward Island Liberal Party MLAs
Prince Edward Island Liberal Party leaders